This is the list of cathedrals in Solomon Islands sorted by denomination.

Roman Catholic 
Cathedrals of the Catholic Church in Solomon Islands:
 St. Augustine Cathedral in Auki
 St. Peter’s Cathedral in Gizo
 Holy Cross Cathedral in Honiara (consecrated 17 September 1978)

Anglican
Cathedrals of the Anglican Church of Melanesia in Solomon Islands:
 Cathedral Church of St Barnabas in Honiara

See also
List of cathedrals

References

Cathedrals
Solomon Islands
Cathedrals in the Solomon Islands
Cathedrals